The Wallis Annenberg Center for the Performing Arts is a community arts center in Beverly Hills, California, named for philanthropist Wallis Annenberg in recognition for The Annenberg Foundation's major gift to fund the campus. It is colloquially known as The Wallis.

Location
The Wallis is located on the corner of North Santa Monica Boulevard and Crescent Drive in Beverly Hills, California.

Amenities
The center was designed by architect Zoltan Pali of SPF:architects. It includes the historic 1933 Beverly Hills post office, the newly built 500-seat Goldsmith Theater, the 150-seat Lovelace Studio Theater, GRoW at The Wallis: A Space for Arts Education, a sculpture garden and a promenade terrace designed by Ron Lutsko. The Goldsmith theater is named after Bram Goldsmith, the Chairman Emeritus of City National Bank. The restored landmark Beverly Hills post office is named for Paula Kent Meehan.

History
Endowed by heiress and philanthropist Wallis Annenberg (born 1939), who donated US$25 million, The Wallis was under construction for ten years. The total cost of creating the center is estimated at $70 million, with an annual operating budget of several million dollars.

The opening on October 17, 2013, was celebrated with a black-tie gala, co-chaired by Wallis Annenberg and Jamie Tisch. Kevin Spacey, John Lithgow and Diane Lane inaugurated the 500-seat Goldsmith Theater by reading letters from Groucho Marx, Tennessee Williams, Peter Tchaikovsky, Will Rogers and others. The evening was followed by a fashion show by Salvatore Ferragamo and performances by the likes of Italian tenor Vittorio Grigolo and Paris Opera Ballet members Mathias Heymann and Myriam Ould-Braham.

As of October 2017, the center's chairman of the board is Michael Nemeroff. The chairman of the executive committee is philanthropist and arts patron David Bohnett, who was board chairman from 2015 to 2017. The Wallis's managing director is arts administrator and fundraiser Rachel Fine, and the artistic director is Paul Crewes of Kneehigh Theatre.

The Wallis and Deaf West Theatre's acclaimed 2015 co-production of Spring Awakening (musical), performed simultaneously in American Sign Language and spoken English by a cast of 27, transferred to Broadway's Brooks Atkinson Theatre in September 2015 and went on to receive 3 Tony Award nominations including Best Revival of a Musical and Best Director Michael Arden.

Performances
2013/2014 Inaugural Season Highlights
Parfumerie (EP Dowdall adaptation from Miklos Laszlo play)
Martha Graham Dance Company
Catherine Wheels Theatre Company's White
Noël Coward's Brief Encounter from Kneehigh Theatre
Maurice Hines is Tappin' Thru Life

2014/2015 Season Highlights
Oregon Shakespeare Festival's Into the Woods
Patti LuPone's Coulda Shoulda Woulda... Played that Part
National Theatre of Scotland and Royal Shakespeare Company's Dunsinane (play)
Deaf West Theatre's Spring Awakening (musical)

2015/2016 Season Highlights
An Evening with Denzel Washington
Twyla Tharp: 50th Anniversary Celebration 
Mel Brooks in Conversation with David Steinberg 
Oregon Shakespeare Festival's Guys and Dolls

2016/2017 Season Highlights
Complicite's The Encounter by Simon McBurney
Stephen Sondheim's Merrily We Roll Along (musical) from Michael Arden (inaugural artist-in-residence)
Deaf West Theatre's Edward Albee's At Home at the Zoo 
Paul Taylor Dance Company

2017/2018 Season Highlights
Bristol Old Vic's Long Day's Journey into Night with Jeremy Irons and Lesley Manville
Kneehigh Theatre's The Flying Lovers of Vitebsk from Emma Rice
 The Heart of Robin Hood from Iceland's Vesturport
Benjamin Millepied's L.A. Dance Project (inaugural company-in-residence)

Awards and nominations

References

External links
Official website

Annenberg
Buildings and structures in Beverly Hills, California
Theatres in Los Angeles County, California
Theatres completed in 2013
2013 establishments in California